Francisco Cámera (born 1 January 1944) is a Uruguayan football defender who played for Uruguay in the 1970 FIFA World Cup. He also played for C.A. Bella Vista. In Argentina, he played for Platense.

References

External links
 FIFA profile

1944 births
Living people
Uruguayan footballers
Uruguay international footballers
Association football defenders
C.A. Bella Vista players
Club Atlético Platense footballers
Uruguayan expatriate footballers
Expatriate soccer players in the United States
Expatriate footballers in Argentina
1970 FIFA World Cup players